2011 UEFA European Under-17 Football Championship (Elite Round) was the second round of qualifications for the final tournament of UEFA U-17 Championship 2011.
The 28 teams advancing from the qualifying round were distributed into seven groups of four teams each, with each group contesting in a round-robin format, with one of the four teams hosting all six group games. The seven group-winning teams automatically qualified for the final tournament in Serbia.
Each team was placed in one of four drawing pots, according to their qualifying round results. The seven sides with the best records were placed in Pot A, and so forth until Pot D, which contained the seven teams with the weakest records. During the draw, each group were filled with one team from every pot, with the only restriction being that teams that played each other in the first qualifying round can not be drawn into the same group again. The draw was held at 30 November, 2010 at 11:15 (CET) at Nyon, Switzerland.

The hosts of the seven one-venue mini-tournament groups are indicated below in italics.

The matches will played between 9–31 March 2011.

Group 1

Group 2

Group 3

Group 4

Group 5

Group 6

Group 7

References

External links
 uefa.com

Qualification
UEFA European Under-17 Championship qualification